Loudspeakers were invented in the early 20th century, and they were introduced in mosques in the 1930s, where they are used by a muezzin for the adhan ("call to prayer"), and sometimes for khutbah (sermons).

Outdoor loudspeakers, usually mounted on tall minarets, are used five times a day for the call to prayer, beginning at dawn. Some mosques have loudspeakers that are powerful enough to be heard as far as 5 km (3 mi) away. In areas where more than one mosque is present, the loudspeaker sounds overlap one another, especially in the early morning when sounds are more clearly heard. Loudspeakers are sometimes also used inside mosques to deliver sermons or for prayer.

The first known installation of a microphone–loudspeaker set occurred in 1936 in the Masjid Sultan in Singapore; it was reported that the summons to prayer could 'carry more than a mile'. Though some mosque attendees were sceptical of this new electric system, most believed it was necessary to empower the muezzin's voice to transcend a modern city's noises. Electrically amplified adhans have become commonplace in countries such as Turkey and Morocco, whereas in others such as the Netherlands only 7 to 8% of all mosques employ loudspeakers for the call to prayer.

High volumes that modern mosque loudspeakers can generate prompted Saudi Arabia's Ministry Of Islamic Affairs to issue a directive in late May 2021 to restrict mosque loudspeaker volumes to "one third of maximum", an instruction that has been met with some social backlash in the Islamic Kingdom. Additionally, the Ministry also stipulated that loudspeaker use was to be restricted to the calls to prayers only.

Legality 

Limitation on calls to prayer by Muslims exist in countries including the Netherlands, Germany, Switzerland, France, the UK, Austria, Norway, and Belgium. Some cities have independently banned or restricted the use of loudspeakers by mosques, including Lagos, Nigeria, and some communities in the US state of Michigan.

Opposition

Germany
In Cologne, Germany, the proposed construction of the Cologne Central Mosque encountered strong criticism from some area residents; a ban on broadcasting the call to prayer over loudspeakers outside the building was among the first stipulations that the mosque's supporters had to agree to when seeking a building permit.

India
In India, noise pollution activists have called for restricting the use of loudspeakers, stating religion is not a ground to violate noise rules.  In 1999, in debating a proposed blanket ban on loudspeakers atop mosques, some political leaders in India alleged that loudspeakers had been used to create communal tension, and that they had been used to incite a riot in Nandurbar, Maharashtra state, on November 10, 1999.

Indonesia
Indonesia, the world's most populous Muslim nation, has recognized that the overzealous use of sound amplification by its many mosques is an environmental issue and appears to be taking official measures to curb the problem. However, in August 2018, a woman who complained of the volume of her local mosque's speakers was eventually given an 18-month prison sentence for blasphemy, while mobs burned 14 Buddhist temples following the news of her complaint against the loudspeakers.  As a direct response to this incident, Indonesia's Ministry of Religious Affairs issued a circular on Adhan or the Islamic call to prayer, with guidelines on when and how it ought to be broadcast by mosques. The issue continues to divide as of March 2022 when the Ministry issued even stricter guidelines, which included restricting sound levels to 100 decibels and any pre-call to prayer sermons to 10 minutes duration, down from the previous 15.

United Kingdom
On 5 May 2020 Waltham Forest council, London, gave eight mosques permission to publicly broadcast its call to prayer during Ramadan. On 14 May 2020 Newham Council followed suit, granting permission to nineteen mosques within the London borough to publicly broadcast its call to prayer during Ramadan. Many residents in the area of Newham, in dispute of the decision, wrote to the Mayor's office occupied by Rokshana Fiaz. On the 20 May 2020 residents concerned with the public broadcast to prayer received a response back from the Mayor in which she stated: "I am sorry if you were offended by the call to prayer, but the Council does not propose to take any further action or correspond further on this matter."

Harrow Council proposed a planning application to allow Harrow Central Mosque to publicly broadcast its prayer call every Friday at 6 pm for three months.

On 31 May 2020, Maidenhead Mosque was given permission by Maidenhead council to publicly broadcast its call to prayer on a one-off occasion.

United States
In 2004, the Al-Islah Mosque in Hamtramck, Michigan, US, attracted national attention when it requested permission to broadcast its call to prayer. This upset many of the non-Muslim residents of the area, which has a large and long-established Polish Catholic population. Proponents pointed out that the city was already subject to loud bell ringing from the local church, while opponents argued that the church bells served a nonreligious purpose. Later that year, the city amended its noise regulations to limit the volume of all religious sounds. Prior to this, other mosques in the Detroit area had been using loudspeakers to broadcast their calls to prayer without incident.

See also 
 Church bell
 Shabbat siren
 NIMBY
 Aircraft noise pollution
 Environmental noise

References 

1930s introductions
Telecommunications-related introductions in the 1930s
Loudspeakers
Mosque-related controversies
Mu'azzins
Noise pollution
Soundscape ecology